Paul Howard MacGillivray (1834–1895) was a scientist and medical practitioner by occupation, born at Edinburgh to William MacGillivray and Marion , and was the brother of John MacGillivray, who became a noted naturalist.

Early life 
MacGillivray was educated at Marischal College in the University of Aberdeen. His father, William, was appointed a professor there in 1841, a teacher of natural history. During his time as a student, Paul wrote and published a catalogue, entitled A Catalogue of the Flowering Plants and Ferns growing in the neighbourhood of Aberdeen, with the help and support of his father. However, when MacGillivray's father died in September 1852, he lost interest in the studies of science, and instead chose to practise medicine, in London. Later that year, MacGillivray decided to migrate to Melbourne, Australia.

Migration to Australia 
In Australia he continued his medical practice, and began working at Williamstown, where he joined a local, voluntary fire brigade, and served as the brigade's medical officer.

Between the years of 1862 and 1873, MacGillivray acted as a surgeon in the hospital of Bendigo, where he organised a private medical practice. While MacGillivray's deepest interest remained natural history, he showed talent and potential in medicine, and he produced numerous papers and essays in relation to surgery and surgical matters. His work was prolific and which led him to be elected president of the Medical Society of Victoria.

Paul MacGillivray also became known as a notable Australian naturalists of the time. Following his work as a naturalist, MacGillivray was selected as a member of the Philosophical Institute (later Royal Society) of Victoria. MacGillivray also wrote several papers in relation to nature, some illustrated, as well as undertaking several projects of research. Additionally, at a later stage in his life, MacGillivray formed relations and a membership with the Field Naturalists' Club of Victoria.

Death 
Paul MacGillivray died on 9 July 1895 at his house in Bendigo. It was at this time that he close to completing a monograph (on the Polyzoa of Victoria) for the Royal Society of Victoria. He was survived by Elizabeth, née Shields, his wife, five daughters and a son. His collections, papers, findings and library were donated to the National Museum of Victoria by the government shortly after his death.

References

External links 
 

Australian naturalists
Scottish emigrants to Australia
1834 births
1895 deaths
Alumni of the University of Aberdeen
Medical doctors from Edinburgh
Scottish botanists
19th-century Scottish medical doctors